Donald T. Lunsford II is a dancer, choreographer, and artistic director located in Philadelphia, Pennsylvania. In addition to his success with the African American modern dance company, Philadanco, Lunsford has a multitude of experiences in dance throughout the Philadelphia area.

Background
Lunsford began his dance training at the University of the Arts in Philadelphia, Pennsylvania. There he received a Bachelor in Fine Arts degree, with his main focus in modern dance. While studying at University of the Arts, he was simultaneously studying at the Philadelphia Dance Company (Philadanco).

With hard work, Lunsford became the company’s most highlighted dancer and upon retiring from performing, he maintained his presence at Philadanco as a guest artist. He has also provided choreography for Drexel University, Glassboro State College, Swarthmore College, the University of Pennsylvania, as well as others.  Not limited to choreographic talents, Lunsford is also experienced in stage production, contributing his talents to groups such as the Opera of Philadelphia, the Theatre Center of Philadelphia, and the Academy of Vocal Arts.

Involvement with D/2
For over 30 years, his role as Artistic Director of D/2, an apprentice group of Philadanco, has paved the way for many less experienced dancers to gain enough knowledge to graduate into Philadanco. His pupils have also spread to other companies such as The Washington Ballet, Alvin Ailey Dance Theater, Dayton Contemporary Dance Company, The Juilliard School, and The Philadelphia Dance Company.

Achievements
Lunsford is the recipient of impressive list of awards for his contributions to the dance world and arts education as a whole.  Some of these include:
 Appreciation Award for the Most Outstanding Teacher from The Philadelphia School of Dance Arts
 Certificate of Appreciation from the Philadelphia Mayor’s office for Community Service
 Fellowship Grant from the Pennsylvania Council of the Arts

References

Living people
African-American choreographers
American choreographers
Artists from Philadelphia
Year of birth missing (living people)
University of the Arts (Philadelphia) alumni
21st-century African-American people